Visitors to Togo must obtain a visa on arrival or electronic visa  unless they come from one of the visa-exempt countries. Alternatively, they may obtain a visa from one of the Togolese diplomatic missions.

Visa policy map

Visa exemption 
Citizens of the following countries can visit Togo without a visa:

1 - Listed as visa-exempt by the Togo Embassy in the United Kingdom, but not listed as such in the Timatic database.

Visa exemption also applies to holders of diplomatic and service passports of China (including passports for public affairs), Morocco, Russia.

A visa exemption agreement for diplomatic and service passports was signed with Qatar on 30 April 2018.

Visa on arrival 
Nationals of all other countries except  can obtain a visa on arrival for a maximum stay of 7 days, if they hold a return or onward ticket. Extension of stay is possible for an additional 90 days.

See also

Visa requirements for Togolese citizens

References

Togo
Foreign relations of Togo